Middlewood is a small village in the parish of North Hill, Cornwall, England, UK. Middlewood is in the valley of the River Lynher and on the B3254 road between Launceston and Liskeard. There was formerly a Bible Christian chapel at Middlewood.

References

Villages in Cornwall